Continental Drift (South) is a 2022 Swiss-French comedy-drama film written by Lionel Baier and Laurent Larivière, directed by Baier and starring Isabelle Carré and Théodore Pellerin.

Cast
Isabelle Carré as Nathalie Adler
Théodore Pellerin as Albert Adler
Ursina Lardi as Ute Lerner
Ivan Georgiev as Timotei Bacalov

Release
The film premiered at the Cannes Film Festival in May 2022.

Reception
Allan Hunter of Screen International gave the film a positive review and wrote, "Pleasantly entertaining, Continental Drift has a busy plot that finds easy solutions to complex issues and turns towards the sentimental..." Alex Heeney of Seventh Row said, "Lionel Baier’s biting yet heartfelt Cannes film Continental Drift (South) tackles the migrant crisis and personal failures of empathy with wit and intelligence."

References

External links